Nebojša (Cyrillic script: Небојша ) is a Slavic given name, meaning "fearless". People with the name include:

In arts and entertainment
Nebojša Bradić (born 1956), Serbian theater director
Nebojša Glogovac (born 1969), award-winning Serbian actor
Nebojša Malešević (born 1983), Bosnian Serb fashion model
Nebojša Pajkić (born 1951), writer and professor of film dramaturgy

In government and politics
Nebojša Čović, Ph.D. (born 1958), Serbian politician and businessman
Nebojša Kaluđerović (born 1955), Montenegrin politician and diplomat
Nebojša Koharović (born 1963), Croatian diplomat and the current Croatian Ambassador to the People's Republic of China
Nebojša Krstić (born 1957), Advisor of the President of Serbia for public relations
Nebojša Medojević (born 1966), politician in Montenegro
Nebojša Pavković (born 1946), former Chief of the General Staff of FRY
Nebojša Radmanović (born 1949), Bosnian Serb politician

In sport

Basketball
Nebojša Bogavac, professional Montenegrin basketball player
Nebojša Joksimović (basketball) (born 1981), Slovenian professional basketball player
Nebojša Popović (born 1923), Serbian basketball player, coach and administrator

Football (soccer)
Nebojša Gudelj (born 1968), former Yugoslav/Bosnian association footballer
Nebojša Jelenković (born 1978), Serbian football midfielder
Nebojša Joksimović (footballer) (born 1981), Serbian football player
Nebojša Krupniković (born 1973), Serbian football player
Nebojša Marinković (born 1986), Serbian footballer
Nebojša Novaković (born 1964), Bosnian-Swedish former football player
Nebojša Pavlović (born 1981), Serbian football player
Nebojša Pejić (born 1988), Bosnian Serb football midfielder
Nebojša Petrović, Serbian football manager and former player
Nebojša Šćepanović (born 1967), former Montenegrin football midfielder
Nebojša Skopljak (born 1987), Serbian football player
Nebojša Šodić (born 1985), Bosnian Serb professional football defender
Nebojša Vučićević (born 1962), former Serbian football player
Nebojša Zlatarić (born 1953), Serbian former striker

Other sports
Nebojša Đorđević (born 1973), Serbian tennis player
Nebojša Grahovac (born 1984), Bosnian professional handballer
Nebojša Popović (handballer) (born 1947), Serbian former handball player
Nebojša Jovanović (born 1997), Serbian road bicycle racer

In other fields
Nebojša Radunović, university professor of Obstetrics and Gynecology at University of Belgrade School of Medicine

See also
 
 Slavic names

External links

Slavic masculine given names
Bosnian masculine given names
Croatian masculine given names
Macedonian masculine given names
Montenegrin masculine given names
Serbian masculine given names